Dimitri may refer

People
 Dmitry, a male given name, Slavic version of Greek name Demetrios
 Dimitri (clown) (1935–2016), Swiss clown and mime
 Dimitri Atanasescu, Ottoman-born Aromanian teacher
 Dimitri from Paris, French DJ
 Dimitri Flowers (born 1996), American football player
 Dimitri Payet (born 1987), French footballer
 Dimitri Roger (born 1992), American rapper known professionally as Rich the Kid
 Dimitri Vegas, Belgian DJ, part of Dimitri Vegas & Like Mike

Other
 Dimitri (Joncières), 1876 based on Schiller's Demetrius
 Dimitrij (opera), Dvořák opera, 1881 also based on Schiller's Demetrius
 Dimethyltryptamine, an endogenous and hallucinogenic tryptamine more commonly known as DMT
 Dimitri, an early codename for the video game Milo and Kate by Lionhead Studios
 Dimitri Alexandre Blaiddyd, a character from the video games Fire Emblem: Three Houses and Fire Emblem Warriors: Three Hopes
 Demitri Maximoff, a character from the Darkstalkers video game franchise
 Dimitri, a character from the 1997 film Anastasia